Summary justice may refer to:
Handling of summary offenses
Frontier justice, also called "vigilante justice"
Vigilantism or vigilante justice
Summary execution, execution of a person upon their being accused of a crime, without a full and fair trial;  usually pejorative

See also
Summary judgment, judgment entered by a judge or jury for one party and against another, without a full trial. Often a pretrial dismissal of an entire case.  Sometimes a ruling on discrete issues in a case.  Not pejorative.